"Reckless" is a song by American singer Madison Beer, released on June 4, 2021, through Epic and Sing It Loud, It was originally intended to be the lead single from Beer's upcoming second studio album, however in one of her Instagram Live sessions she confirmed that it wasn’t the lead single, but instead “Dangerous” was. She stated that it could possibly still make the album, because her and her team like it so much, but she isn’t sure. The track was written and produced by Madison Beer, Leroy Clampitt, and Kinetics & One Love's Tim Sommers, with Kinetics & One Love's Jeremy Dussolliet also receiving writing credits.

Background 
Madison Beer released her debut album titled Life Support in early 2021. Days before the release of Life Support, Beer revealed that she was already half way through the new record, and would eventually head herself to a writing camp to finish the new album, with the same songwriters and producers, with whom she worked on her debut.

Composition 
According to Beer, "Reckless" is about "how easy it is for some people in relationships to hurt others and move on without any guilt". She both co-wrote and co-produced the single.

Critical reception 
Reckless was met with critical acclaim upon its release. Clash called the song "...a wonderfully adult piece of pop songwriting." Hypebae said the song "demonstrat[es] her signature soothing vocals."

Music video 
The music video was released on June 29, 2021. It depicts Beer in a fairytale-like world where she climbs a ladder to get to the top of a stack of giant books; stands on the top of a car as it drives itself through a tunnel; and swims in an ocean with book pages in it.

Credits and personnel 
Madison Beer – vocals, songwriting, production, composer, associated performer 
Leroy Clampitt – songwriting; production, composer, background vocals, bass, drums, guitar, programmer
Tim Sommers – songwriting, production, composer, background vocals, drums, keyboards, programmer
Jeremy Dussoliet – songwriting, composer
Randy Merrill – mastering engineer
Mitch McCarthy – mixing engineer
Kinga Bacik  – strings

Charts

Release history

References 

2021 singles
2021 songs
Madison Beer songs